The Manifesto of Manzanares was issued 7 July 1854 in Manzanares, Spain. Drafted by Antonio Cánovas del Castillo and signed by General Leopoldo O'Donnell, it called for political reforms and a constituent Cortes to bring about an authentic "liberal regeneration".

In 1854, Spain was at the tail end of the década moderada, slightly over ten years of rule by the Moderate Party. In the last few years, the regime had become increasingly corrupt, and even many of those who were sympathetic to its overt political views had turned against it. On 28 June 1854 Leopoldo O'Donnell, General in Chief of the Constitutional Army, led a coup attempt known as La Vicalvarada, which ended indecisively. He and his forces had moved south to Manzanares, Ciudad Real, where they reconnoitered with other like-minded forces.

On 7 July 1854 O'Donnell issued a short manifesto drafted by the young Antonio Cánovas del Castillo, future architect of Spain's Bourbon Restoration of 1874. The manifesto called on all Spaniards to preserve the Throne but to get rid of the current government. It reflected the politics of the Progressive Party. In its entirety it reads:

The country heeded the call, and within weeks the Moderate government had fallen, ushering in the bienio progresista.

Notes

Political history of Spain
Political manifestos
1854 in politics
1854 in Spain
1854 documents